The Lewis Anderson House, Barn and Granary is a historic ensemble of buildings, currently located in The Dalles, Oregon, United States. This well-preserved set of 1890s Swedish American vernacular architecture was originally located on a farm on Pleasant Ridge, south of The Dalles. Lewis Anderson was a Swedish immigrant who, after establishing himself on Pleasant Ridge, worked semi-successfully to encourage further Swedish settlement in the area of The Dalles. The sidehill barn, with grade entrances on two levels, was the first erected of the ensemble, in 1890. The house was built by Anderson and fellow Swedish immigrant Ab Pearson in 1895. Anderson purchased and relocated the granary from a neighboring farm in 1898, in the process repurposing it from its previous function as a house.

The buildings were relocated to The Dalles in 1972 in order to restore and protect them, and were made part of the Fort Dalles Museum at that time. They were entered onto the National Register of Historic Places in 1980.

See also
National Register of Historic Places listings in Wasco County, Oregon

References

External links

Buildings and structures in The Dalles, Oregon
Houses on the National Register of Historic Places in Oregon
National Register of Historic Places in Wasco County, Oregon
Houses completed in 1895
Museums in Wasco County, Oregon
Historic house museums in Oregon
Vernacular architecture in Oregon
Houses completed in 1890
Swedish-American culture in Oregon
1890 establishments in Oregon
Houses in The Dalles, Oregon
Relocated buildings and structures in Oregon